Durab may refer to:
 Durab, Kurdistan
 Durab-e Olya-ye Jadid
 Durab-e Qadim
 Durab-e Sofla-ye Jadid